46 Armoured Regiment is an armoured regiment of the Indian Army.

Formation 
46 Armoured Regiment was raised on 01 July 1982 at Ahmednagar. It has an all-India all-class composition, drawing troops from various castes and religions.

History 
The Regiment was presented the ‘President’s Standards’ at  Hisar, Haryana on 17 October 2008 by the then President of India, Mrs. Prathiba Patil.

Equipment
The Regiment had the Vijayanta tanks at raising. Since 2002, it has been equipped with the T-72 tanks.

Operations
The regiment participated in Operation Bluestar soon after its formation. It has also taken part in Operation Trident, Operation Rakshak, Operation Vijay and Operation Parakram.

Major Ratan Kumar Sen was awarded the Shaurya Chakra for his gallant actions during counter terrorism operations in Anantnag, Jammu and Kashmir, while he was serving in 2 Rashtriya Rifles.

Regimental Insignia
The Regimental insignia consists of a thunderbolt, overlaid with the Vijayanta tank and a scroll at the base with the regimental motto in Devanagari script.

The motto of the regiment is वज्र प्रहार प्रचंड वार (Vajra Prahar Prachand Vaar).

External links

 Pictures from Presentation of the Standard to 46 Armoured Regiment at Hisar in Haryana on Oct 17, 2008
 You tube - News video on the Presentation of the Standard

References

Military units and formations established in 1982
Armoured and cavalry regiments of the Indian Army from 1947